Daffodil  English School (DES) is a private English boarding school that was established in 1999. The school is in Kanchanrup Municipality, Saptari District, Nepal. The principal is Durga Niraula.

Education
The school curriculum is based on the National Curriculum of Nepal. The school teaches students from pre-primary level to grade 10. After the national School Leaving Certificate exam at the end of grade 10, students may continue to a higher secondary school.

Infrastructure
The building has one storey, and there is a computer lab. The playground is big enough to host all minor sports.

Sports and extra-curricular activities
The school conducts a major sports event on 14 September (Bhadra 29) every year to celebrate Children's Day. Prizes are given to the winners of different games, as well as to students who have shown good performance in different fields like discipline, responsibility, cleanliness throughout the year.

See also
List of educational institutions in Kanchan Rup

Boarding schools in Nepal
Secondary schools in Nepal
Educational institutions established in 1999
Saptari District
1999 establishments in Nepal